Parliamentary elections were held in Afghanistan alongside provincial elections on 18 September 2005. Former warlords and their followers gained the majority of seats in both the lower house and the provincial council (which elects the members of the upper house). Women won 28% of the seats in the lower house, six more than the 25% guaranteed in the 2004 constitution.

Electoral system
Approximately twelve million voters were eligible to vote for the 249-seat Wolesi Jirga, the lower house of parliament, and 34 provincial councils. The 2,707 parliamentary candidates (328 female, 2,379 male) are all independent; parties are not recognized by law and lists do not exist. This has been the subject of criticism: relatively unknown people could win a seat as easily as very popular candidates. It has also made it considerably difficult for the population to decide whom to vote for, even though some candidates may be a member of or (financially) backed by a political party.

Another source of criticism is the use of the single, non-transferable vote in multi-member constituencies, particularly in the absence of party lists. In other words, each province elects a number of members, but each voter can vote for only one candidate. This runs the risk of fragmenting the vote to the point where candidates can be elected virtually by chance. Early returns confirmed this fear. For example, in Farah Province, one of the first provinces to declare its results, 46 candidates competed for five seats. No candidate polled more than 11%, and four of the five elected candidates polled less than 8%.  In Kabul, which had 33 seats available, most of the candidates elected received well under 1% while over 30% of the votes cast went to three candidates, with the leading candidate receiving over 25 times the vote of the candidate elected with the lowest vote share, and several elected candidates receiving less than 2000 votes. This creates the risk of a legislature in which the majority of members have little or no legitimacy.

Because a sizable percentage of the Afghan population is unable to read and write, all candidates had an icon as well. Those icons were included on the lists. These included, but were not limited to, pictures of footballs, cars or different sorts of flowers. Because there were not enough different icons, some candidates had multiple icons as their symbol: two or three footballs behind each other, like Gulallay Habib (page 16 of the Kabul parliament candidate list). For example, the candidate list for the Nuristan section of the parliament looked like this. Candidates were not able to choose the icons themselves: instead, the electoral committee chose them. Forty-five candidates were refused because of connections with armed groups or for not giving up their government jobs.

People vote for a candidate in their own province. Each province has a number of representatives in parliament, depending on the population. The largest province by population, Kabul, has 33 seats (390 candidates, 50 female, 340 male), whereas the small ones like Nuristan, Nimruz and Panjshir, have only two.

The total number of candidates for the provincial councils was 3,025. Each province, except Oruzgan, had women running for seats in the provincial council. Female candidates ran for parliament in all districts. District council elections, originally also scheduled for the same date, were not held in 2005 (district numbers, boundaries and population figures had to be determined first).

These were the first parliamentary elections in Afghanistan in 33 years: after communist rule, civil war and Taliban rule, the U.S. invasion of Afghanistan toppled the Taliban regime and after the presidential elections in 2004, parliamentary elections were organized in 2005. Originally, according to the 2001 Bonn agreement, the elections were to be held in June 2004. However, due to the security situation, Hamid Karzai (then interim President, now President of Afghanistan) moved the elections more than a year to the later date. Security was still an issue, as Taliban and others threatened to disrupt the elections violently. Several candidates were killed before polling.

A quarter of the seats - 68 seats - in the parliament are reserved for women, as well as 10 seats for the Kuchi community. Those are minimum numbers: there is no maximum for the number of seats for those groups. The 102 members of the Meshrano Jirga, the upper house, are indirectly elected by the provincial councils.

Conduct
During the 2009 Afghan elections, former U.S. Ambassador to Afghanistan Ronald E. Neumann recalled that the "indelible" ink used in the 2005 election to prevent people from voting more than once had turned out to be washable after all. The same problem had also occurred in the 2004 presidential elections, and was repeated again in the 2009 elections.

Results
Turnout was estimated at 50%, substantially lower than at the presidential election in October 2004. This is blamed on the lack of identifiable party lists as a result of Afghanistan's new electoral law, which left voters in many cases unclear on who they were voting for. Turnout was highest in the Turkmen, Uzbek and the Tajik populated provinces in the north - generally over 60% - and 50% in some of the Pashtun southeastern areas where the Taliban insurgency is strongest. Turnout was also surprisingly low (34%) in the capital Kabul, which is dominated by Tajiks.

The first results were declared on 9 October, with final results being delayed by accusations of fraud, and were finally announced on 12 November. Only a minority of candidates contested the election on a party ticket, whilst a number of elected MPs were loosely associated with certain parties.

Elected members

See also
Enemies of Happiness, a documentary film shot during the election

References

Joint Electoral Management Body. Election results by province can be found here.
Drei Frauen im afghanischen Wahlkampf, in: Neue Zürcher Zeitung, 15 September 2005
Electionworld: elections in Afghanistan. Retrieved September 28, 2007.
BBC Afghanistan election guide. Retrieved September 28, 2007.
Candidate statistics. Retrieved September 28, 2007
Radio Free Europe/azadiradio: Afghanistan Votes. Retrieved September 28, 2007
Afghanistan: Old Problems, New Parliament, New Expectations U.S. Institute of Peace Briefing, October 2005. Retrieved September 28, 2007
DefenseLINK News: Afghans Enjoy Successful Election Day

Afghanistan
Elections in Afghanistan
Parliamentary election
Afghanistan
National Assembly (Afghanistan)
History of Afghanistan (1992–present)
Afghanistan
Election and referendum articles with incomplete results